The Usatove (Usatovo in Russian) culture is an Eneolithic group of the North Pontic region with influences from the Cucuteni–Trypillia culture as well as the Eneolithic steppe cultures of the North Pontic. Usatove flourished northwest of the Black Sea during the 4th millennium BCE.
The culture got its name from the name of the village of Usatove in the Odesa Oblast of Ukraine.

The Usatove culture appears to be a mixture of the Eneolithic agrarian cultures of Southeast Europe, with influences from the steppe cultures from the Pontic steppe. The Eneolithic farming culture influences on Usatove include clay figurines and painted ceramics, while it shares tumulus (kurgan) burials and shell-tempered coarse wares with steppe cultures. It also displays items made of metal, such as arsenical bronze and silver, which suggests contacts with the North Caucasus as well as Anatolia.

In Ukraine, Usatove culture sites are predominantly located in the Dniester-Danube interfluve. The two largest Usatove archaeological sites in Ukraine, Usatove-Velykyj Kuyalnik and Mayaky, contain kurgan and ground cemeteries (necropoli). The total number of Usatove sites in northwest and west Pontic is currently estimated at around 100.

Within the Kurgan hypothesis, the Usatove culture represents the domination of native Cucuteni–Trypillia agriculturalists by Indo-European peoples from the steppe. According to Anthony, the roots of the pre-Germanic languages lay in the Usatove culture.

Why the generally accepted chronological placement of Usatove is in the second half of the 4th millennium BCE, radiocarbon dates on human remains identified as Usatove are consistently older. Most of these dates cluster around the last quarter of the 5th - first quarter of the 4th millennium BCE. It is likely that the dates on human remains are influenced by aquatic reservoir effect, the precise quantification of which is not possible at the moment due the lack of radiocarbon and stable isotope data from contextual faunal remains.

Gallery

See also

 Suvorovo culture
 Novodanilovka group

References

Sources
 Манзура, Игорь; Петренко, Владислав. (2022) УСАТОВСКИЙ КУРГАННЫЙ МОГИЛЬНИК II (по раскопкам 1984 г.). Tyragetia, s.n., vol. XVI [XXXI], nr. 1, 2022, 83-101.
 Патокова, Э.Ф. (1979) Усатовское поселение и могильники. Киев: Наукова Думка.
 Петренко, В.Г.; Кайзер, Э. (2011). Комплексный памятник Маяки: новые изотопные даты и некоторые вопросы хронологии наличных культур. Материалы по археологии Северного Причерноморья 12, 31-61.
 
 

Archaeological cultures in Bulgaria
Archaeological cultures in Romania
Archaeological cultures in Ukraine
Chalcolithic cultures of Europe